Ilham Tower, also known as Ilham Baru Tower and IB Tower is a 58-story, 274-meter-tall skyscraper in Kuala Lumpur, Malaysia. It is Malaysia's seventh tallest building. The Ilham Tower is the result of an extensive and careful form-finding process. Its diagonal exo-skeleton, comprising triangulated concrete frames and external trusses, is offset against the elegant glazing within the building's structural armor.

The architecture of Ilham Tower with its dramatic lines and form is destined to be the toast of the city. Ilham tower has parking facilities for employees and visitors.

See also
 List of tallest buildings in Malaysia
 List of tallest buildings in Kuala Lumpur

References

External links

 
 Facts of Ilham Baru Tower - The Skyscraper Center

Office buildings completed in 2015
Skyscrapers in Kuala Lumpur
Skyscraper office buildings in Kuala Lumpur
Residential skyscrapers in Malaysia
2015 establishments in Malaysia